Foxsons Mill, Staincliffe was a doubling mill in Dewsbury, West Yorkshire. It was Lancashire Cotton Corporation sole mill in West Yorkshire. A doubling mill, it doubled yarns of counts 4's to 40's. built in It was taken over by the Lancashire Cotton Corporation in the 1930s and passed to Courtaulds in 1964. The mill was demolished in 1973, and the land is now housing.

Location 
It is situated between a number of larger towns and cities.

Geologically, the town is situated on rock dated to the Carboniferous Period, consisting of coal measures and gritstones. Quaternary Period rock, glacial deposits and gravels exist in the Calder Valley.  Coal, stone and gravel have all been exploited commercially.

Foxson's mill was on the Halifax road out of Staincliffe.

History 
The industry peaked in 1912 when it produced 8 billion yards of cloth. The great war of 1914- 1918 halted the supply of raw cotton, and the British government encouraged its colonies to build mills to spin and weave cotton. The war over, Lancashire never regained its markets. The independent mills were struggling. The Bank of England set up the Lancashire Cotton Corporation in 1929 to attempt to rationalise and save the industry. Foxsons Mill, Staincliffe was one of 104 mills bought by the LCC, and one of the 53 mills that survived through to 1950.

Architecture 
This was a F. W. Dixon Mill.

Owners
Lancashire Cotton Corporation (1930s–1964)
Courtaulds (1964–

See also 

Textile manufacturing

References

Bibliography

External links
 Cottontown.org website
 Spinningtheweb.org website

Textile mills in West Yorkshire
Buildings and structures in Dewsbury
Textile mills owned by the Lancashire Cotton Corporation
Demolished buildings and structures in England
Demolished manufacturing buildings and structures
Buildings and structures demolished in 1973
1973 disestablishments in England